The Lo Nuestro Excellence Award is an award honoring an artist's contribution to Latin music. It was first awarded at the 2nd Annual Lo Nuestro Awards in 1990 and has since been presented annually. The Lo Nuestro Awards were established by American television network Univision in 1989 to recognize the most talented performers of Latin music. Before the inception of the Latin Grammy Awards in 2000, the Lo Nuestro Awards were considered to be the Latin music equivalent of the Grammy Awards. Unlike the other award categories, where the nominees and winners are decided by the public through an online survey, the recipients of the Excellence Award are selected by Univision and Billboard magazine. The trophy awarded is shaped in the form of a treble clef. During the presentation, a tribute is held to the winner which features highlights of their career and several artists performing live covers of the recipient's notable songs.

The Excellence Award was first presented to Cuban singer Celia Cruz. Since its inception, the accolade has been mostly given to individuals, though five musical ensembles have also earned the achievement. Artists from Mexico have received the trophy more than any other nationalities with 16. Cuban-American singer Gloria Estefan was honored with the Excellence Award in 1992 while her husband Emilio Estefan was bestowed with the accolade two years later. They were both presented with the award again in 2018. Mexican singer Antonio Aguilar was given the accolade in 2000 and his son Pepe Aguilar earned it in 2012. Juan Luis Guerra was honored with the trophy in 2007 and was later recognized as Person of the Year by the Latin Recording Academy in the same year. The most recent recipient of the Excellence Award is Puerto Rican rapper Wisin who was presented with the accolade in 2021.

Recipients

See also
Billboard Latin Music Lifetime Achievement Award
Latin Grammy Lifetime Achievement Award
List of lifetime achievement awards

References

1990 establishments in the United States
Awards established in 1990
Lo Nuestro Awards
Lifetime achievement awards
Music-related lists